Charles Ramsay Fleming Loch (11 February 1825 – 7 July 1892) was a Scottish first-class cricketer and clergyman.

The son of William Loch, was born at Edinburgh in February 1825. He was educated at both the Edinburgh Academy and Rugby School. He later matriculated to University College, Oxford in 1844. While studying at Oxford, he made five appearances in first-class cricket for Oxford University between 1845–48, including two appearances in The University Match. He scored 37 runs in his five appearances, in addition to taking 6 wickets.

After graduating from Oxford, Seymour took holy orders in the Church of England. He was reverend at Berhampore in British India. Loch died in Scotland at Dumfries in July 1892.

References

External links

1825 births
1892 deaths
Cricketers from Edinburgh
People educated at Rugby School
Alumni of University College, Oxford
Scottish cricketers
Oxford University cricketers
19th-century Scottish clergy